Tongaat Hulett is an agriculture and agri-processing business, focusing on the complementary feedstocks of sugarcane and maize.  The company had its origins on the North coast of KwaZulu-Natal, specifically the town of Tongaat. The company was formed as a result of a merger between the Tongaat Sugar Company founded by Edward Saunders and Hulett's Sugar founded in 1892 by Liege Hulett.  Company stock is listed on the Johannesburg Securities Exchange.  Its core businesses are sugar, starch and property management.

In the 2014/15 season, 1.314 million tons of sugar were produced.

Operations

South Africa 
 The company head office is located at Amanzimnyama, Tongaat near Durban.
 Sugar mills are located at Maidstone, Darnall, Amatikulu and Felixton.
 A central refinery is in Durban
 Animal feeds operation (Voermol Feeds)

Mozambique 
 Tongaat Hulett Açucar,  Maputo
 Açucareira de Xinavane  Xinavane Mill, Xinavane, Manhiça District, Maputo Province
 Açucareira de Moçambique  Mafambisse Mill, in Mafambisse, Dondo District, near Beira, in Sofala Province

Eswatini 
 Tambankulu Estates, Mhlume – The company operates two agricultural estates on the Mbuluzi River.

Zimbabwe 
Tongaat Hulett's had three sugar estates in Zimbabwe in Chiredzi District and they bordered one another.
 Triangle Estate in Triangle, Zimbabwe
 Hippo Valley Estates, listed on the Zimbabwe Stock Exchange.
 Mkwasine Estates is now occupied by newly resettled farmers Chiredzi District

Animal feeds 
Voermol Feeds, based in Maidstone, produces molasses-based animal feeds.

Artificial sweeteners 
Cape Sweeteners, based in Durban, is a subsidiary of Tongaat Hulett Sugar, producing artificial sweeteners including; aspartame, neotame, acesulfame-K, fructose, sodium saccharin, sodium cyclamate, polydextrose, maltitol and lactitol. It is the exclusive South African agent of Nutrasweet's aspartame and neotame

Starch 
Tongaat Hulett Starch, previously African Products is Africa's largest producer of starch and glucose, produced at five South African factories.

Land development 
Tongaat Hulett Developments is a land conversion and development company that carries out land conversion activities by collaborating closely with the public sector, communities and other businesses.

Corruption scandal
At the end of 2018, the CEO, Peter Staude took early retirement and the chief financial officer, Murray Munro, went on sick-leave. In January 2019, a new CEO was appointed. In February 2019, the company announced a drop in expected profits as well as a liquidity crisis.

In May 2019, the company announced that its published financial results could not be relied on and that the company's equity (the value of the business after liabilities) in its 2018, financial results has been overstated by between R3.5 billion to R4.5 billion in addition revised financial reports would be published in October 2019. The Zimbabwean operation of Tongaat-Hulett has also not been able to provide reliable financial reports in 2019 on time. The auditing firm, PricewaterhouseCoopers were employed to do a forensic audit. The diligence of the company's regular auditors, Deloitte has been called into question. The company suspended trading on the Johannesburg Stock Exchange. In late June 2019, the company laid a criminal charge against an unnamed executive. In an effort to survive the company is cutting costs and has sent retrenchment letters to 5000 employees.
In August 2019, the company decided to remove itself from the list of traded companies on the London Stock Exchange.

In February 2022, seven people connected with the scandal namely, Peter Staude, Murray Hector Munro, Michael Edward Deighton, Rory Edward Wilkinson, Kamasagrie Singh, Samantha Shukla and Gavin Dykes Kruger appeared in the Durban Specialised Commercial Crimes Court and were granted bail. The appeared in court again in April 2022.

References

External links 

Sugar companies of South Africa
Companies of South Africa
EThekwini Metropolitan Municipality
Companies based in KwaZulu-Natal
Agriculture in Zimbabwe
Chiredzi District
Starch companies
Sugar companies
1892 establishments in the British Empire
Companies listed on the Johannesburg Stock Exchange
Accounting scandals
1892 establishments in Africa
Publicly traded companies